Maya Ivanovna Parnas (born 15 May 1974 in Tiraspol, Moldavian SSR) is a Transnistrian politician and was the former acting Prime Minister of Transnistria, temporarily replacing Tatiana Turanskaya, who was focusing on running in the 2015 elections.

See also 
Cabinet of Transnistria

References 

1974 births
Living people
People from Tiraspol
Prime Ministers of Transnistria
Women government ministers of Transnistria
Women prime ministers
21st-century Moldovan women politicians